August Sicard von Sicardsburg (6 December 1813 – 11 June 1868) was an Austrian architect. He is best remembered as the co-architect of the Vienna State Opera, together with Eduard van der Nüll.

Sicardsburg was born in Buda. He studied architecture at the Vienna University of Technology under Peter von Nobile, and together with van der Nüll. In 1843 he became professor at the Vienna Academy.

Karl Freiherr von Hasenauer was one of his students.

Sicardsburg died in 1868 in Weidling, Austria, of tuberculosis, six weeks after his partner Eduard van der Nüll committed suicide; neither saw the opening of the Vienna State Opera in 1869.

List of works

Along with Eduard van der Nüll 
 Schutzengelbrunnen (fountain), 1843–1846
 Sofiensaal, 1845
 Carltheater, 1846–1847
 Arsenal 1849–1855
 Vienna State Opera, 1861–1869
 Haas-Haus, 1866–1868 (now site of the unrelated Haas-Haus)
 Palais Larisch-Mönich, 1867–1868
 Industriepalast on the occasion of the World Exposition of 1873.

References

External links 

People from Buda
1813 births
1868 deaths
19th-century Austrian architects
19th-century deaths from tuberculosis
Tuberculosis deaths in Austria
Historicist architects
Academic staff of TU Wien
Academic staff of the Academy of Fine Arts Vienna